Ttrruuces is the debut studio album by English psychedelic rock band Ttrruuces released on 20 June 2020 through AllPoints Records.

The record is a rock opera which narrates the story of two fictional characters, Sadie and Syd, in their quest to acquire a new drug named Ttrruuces in order to go through a mind-altering journey and find their way in an often bleak world. Each song is accompanied by a music video that comes together as a coming-of-age film. In part, the visuals draw inspiration from 1920s jazz and cartoon music as well as commercials from the 60s and Tim Burton's movies.

Music and lyrics 
Ttrruuces opens with the track "Sad Girl", with lyrics about a 17-year-old girl named Sadie who is depressed and lonely, living in a complicated family situation. As the song progresses, the lyrics tell her to "have a little patience" and wait for better things to happen. "Sad Girl" is a progressive rock song that contains ballad and psychedelic rock elements.

The next track, "Sensations of Cool", explains how disenchanted Sadie feels with the world around her, criticising the ways of modern life, and how she is in search of something real she can hold on to. On the video for "Sensations of Cool", filmmaker Sam Kinsella said:

Track listing

References

2020 debut albums